Kumbang Pasang is a village within Mukim Kianggeh in Brunei-Muara District, Brunei. It is also part of the municipal area of the capital Bandar Seri Begawan. The population was 563 in 2016. It has the postcode BA1511.

Facilities 

 Bandar Seri Begawan Municipal Department, the capital's municipality building.
 One Riverside, a residential and commercial development area.

References 

Villages in Brunei-Muara District
Neighbourhoods in Bandar Seri Begawan